Platynota blanchardi is a species of moth   of the family Tortricidae. It is found in the United States in Arizona and Texas.

The wingspan is 19–20 mm.

References

Moths described in 2012
Platynota (moth)